The women's 5000 metres event at the 2017 Summer Universiade was held on 27 August at the Taipei Municipal Stadium.

Results

References

5000
2017